The 44th Cannes Film Festival was held from 9 to 20 May 1991. The Palme d'Or went to Barton Fink by Joel Coen and Ethan Coen.

The festival opened with Homicide, directed by David Mamet and closed with Thelma & Louise, directed by Ridley Scott.

Juries

Main competition
The following people were appointed as the Jury of the 1991 feature film competition:
Roman Polanski (Poland) Jury President
Férid Boughedir (Tunisia)
Whoopi Goldberg (USA)
Margaret Menegoz (France)
Natalya Negoda (Soviet Union)
Alan Parker (UK)
Jean-Paul Rappeneau (France)
Hans Dieter Seidel (Germany)
Vittorio Storaro (Italy)
Vangelis (Greece)

Camera d'Or
The following people were appointed as the Jury of the 1991 Caméra d'Or:
Géraldine Chaplin (actress) (United States) President
Didier Beaudet (France)
Eva Sirbu (journalist) (Romania)
Fernando Lara (cinephile) (Spain)
Gilles Colpart (critic) (France)
Jan Aghed (journalist) (Sweden)
Myriam Zemmour (cinephile) (France)
Roger Kahane (director) (France)

Official selection

In competition - Feature film
The following feature films competed for the Palme d'Or: The Palme d'Or winner has been highlighted.

Un Certain Regard
The following films were selected for the competition of Un Certain Regard:

 Boyz n the Hood by John Singleton
 Burial of a Potato (Pogrzeb kartofla) by Jan Jakub Kolski
 A Captive in the Land by John Berry
 The Chosen One (Ishanou) by Aribam Syam Sharma
 Comrade Chkalov Crosses the North Pole (Perekhod tovarishcha Chkalova cherez severnyy polyus) by Maksim Pezhemsky
 L'entraînement du champion avant la course by Bernard Favre
 Escape from the 'Liberty' Cinema (Ucieczka z kina 'Wolność) by Wojciech Marczewski
 Fire! (Ta Dona) by Adama Drabo
 Friends, Comrades (Ystävät, toverit) by Rauni Mollberg
 Hearts of Darkness: A Filmmaker's Apocalypse by Fax Bahr, George Hickenlooper
 Holidays on the River Yarra by Leo Berkeley
 In the Alleys of Love (Dar kouchehay-e eshq) by Khosrow Sinai
 Lebewohl, Fremde by Tevfik Başer
 Paths of Death and Angels (Halálutak és angyalok) by Zoltán Kamondi
 Revenge (Mest) by Yermek Shinarbayev
 The Tradition (Laada) by Drissa Toure
 Sango Malo by Bassek Ba Kobhio
 Treasure Island (L'île au trésor) by Raúl Ruiz
 Woman of the Port (La mujer del puerto) by Arturo Ripstein
 Yumeji by Seijun Suzuki

Films out of competition
The following films were selected to be screened out of competition:

 Le film du cinéma suisse by Michel Soutter, Jean-François Amiguet
 Jacquot de Nantes by Agnès Varda
 Life Stinks by Mel Brooks
 Madonna: Truth or Dare (aka. In Bed with Madonna) by Alek Keshishian
 Prospero's Books by Peter Greenaway
 Rhapsody in August (Hachigatsu no rapusodī) by Akira Kurosawa
 Thelma & Louise by Ridley Scott

Short film competition
The following short films competed for the Short Film Palme d'Or:

 Broken Skin by Anna Campion
 Casino by Gil Bauwens
 Les éffaceurs by Gérald Frydman
 Ja, Wałęsa by Jacek Skalski
 Mal de blocs by Marc Saint-Pierre, Nathalie Saint-Gelais
 La Noce by Régis Obadia, Joëlle Bouvier
 Nokturno by Nikola Majdak
 Push Comes to Shove by Bill Plympton
 La vie selon Luc by Jean-Paul Civeyrac
 W.A.L. by Robert Turlo
 With Hands Raised (Z podniesionymi rekami) by Mitko Panov

Parallel sections
International Critics' Week
The following films were screened for the 30th International Critics' Week (30e Semaine de la Critique):Feature film competition Diabły, diabły by Dorota Kędzierzawska (Poland)
 Laafi - Tout va bien by S. Pierre Yameogo (Burkina Faso)
 Liquid Dreams by Mark S. Manos (United States)
 Robert's Movie by Canan Gerede (Turkey)
 Sam & Me by Deepa Mehta (Canada)
 Trumpet Number 7 by Adrian Velicescu (United States)
 La Vie des morts by Arnaud Desplechin (France)
 Young Soul Rebels by Isaac Julien (United Kingdom)Short film competition Carne by Gaspar Noé (France)
 Die mysreriosen lebenslinien by David Rühm (Austria)
 Livraison à domicile by Claude Philippot (France)
 A Nice Arrangement by Gurinder Chadha (United Kingdom) 
 Once Upon a Time by Kristian Petri (Sweden)
 Petit drame dans la vie d’une femme by Andrée Pelletier (Canada)
 Une Symphonie du havre by Barbara Doran (Canada)

Directors' Fortnight
The following films were screened for the 1991 Directors' Fortnight (Quinzaine des Réalizateurs):

 The Adjuster by Atom Egoyan
 Annabelle partagée by Francesca Comencini
 The Cabinet of Dr. Ramirez by Peter Sellars
 Chichkhan by Fadhel Jaïbi, M. Ben Mahmoud
 Danzón by Maria Novaro
 O Drapetis by Lefteris Xanthopoulos
 És mégis... by Zsolt Kézdi-Kovács
 An Imaginary Tale (Une histoire inventée) by André Forcier
 The Indian Runner by Sean Penn
 Lost In Siberia by Alexander Mitta
 Ovo Malo Duse by Ademir Kenović
 Paris Trout by Stephen Gyllenhaal
 Proof by Jocelyn Moorhouse
 Adam's Rib by Vyacheslav Krishtofovich
 Riff-Raff by Ken Loach
 Toto the Hero (Toto le héros) by Jaco Van Dormael
 Suffocating Heat (Caldo soffocante) by Giovanna GagliardoShort films Le Caire by Youssef Chahine

 Awards 

Official awards
The following films and people received the 1991 Official selection awards:
Palme d'Or: Barton Fink by Joel Coen and Ethan Coen
Grand Prize of the Jury: La Belle Noiseuse by Jacques Rivette
Best Director: Joel Coen for Barton Fink
Best Actress: Irène Jacob for The Double Life of Véronique (La double vie de Véronique)
Best Actor: John Turturro for Barton Fink
Best Supporting Actor: Samuel L. Jackson for Jungle Fever
Jury Prize:
Europa by Lars von Trier
Out of Life (Hors la vie) by Maroun BagdadiGolden CameraCaméra d'Or: Toto le Héros by Jaco Van Dormael
Caméra d'Or - Special Mention: Proof by Jocelyn Moorhouse & Sam & Me by Deepa MehtaShort filmsShort Film Palme d'Or: With Hands Raised (Z podniesionymi rekami) by Mitko Panov
 Special Jury Prize: Push Comes to Shove by Bill Plympton

Independent awardsFIPRESCI PrizesThe Double Life of Véronique (La double vie de Véronique) by Krzysztof Kieślowski (In competition)
Riff-Raff by Ken Loach (Directors' Fortnight)Commission Supérieure Technique Technical Grand Prize: Lars von Trier for EuropaEcumenical Jury Prize of the Ecumenical Jury: La double vie de Véronique by Krzysztof Kieślowski
 Ecumenical Jury - Special Mention: Jungle Fever by Spike Lee & La Belle Noiseuse by Jacques RivetteAward of the YouthForeign Film: Toto le Héros by Jaco Van Dormael
French Film: Cheb by Rachid BoucharebAwards in the frame of International Critics' Week'''
SACD Award:
Best Short: Carne by Gaspar Noé
Best Feature: Young Soul Rebels'' by Isaac Julien

References

Media
INA: Robert Mitchum opens the 1991 Festival (commentary in French)
INA: List of winners of the 1991 festival (commentary in French)

External links

1991 Cannes Film Festival (web.archive)
Official website Retrospective 1991 
Cannes Film Festival Awards for 1991 at Internet Movie Database

Cannes Film Festival
Cannes Film Festival
Cannes Film Festival
Cannes